Henry Sandford was a medieval Bishop of Rochester.

Sandford was a royal official before becoming a canon of the diocese of Salisbury and was Archdeacon of Canterbury from about 1213 until he was chosen for Rochester.

Sandford was elected to the see of Rochester on 26 December 1226 and consecrated on 9 May 1227. He was enthroned at Rochester Cathedral on 16 May 1227.

Sandford probably died on 24 February 1235.

Citations

References
 British History Online Archdeacons of Canterbury accessed on 30 October 2007
 British History Online Bishops of Rochester accessed on 30 October 2007
 

Bishops of Rochester
13th-century English Roman Catholic bishops
Archdeacons of Canterbury
1235 deaths
Year of birth unknown